Joseph Bruno Slowinski (November 15, 1962 – September 11, 2001) was an American herpetologist who worked extensively with elapid snakes.

Research and career
Slowinski was born on November 15, 1962 in New York City, New York. He attained his bachelor's degree in biology from the University of Kansas in 1984 and went on to receive his Ph.D. at the University of Miami in 1991, studying under herpetologist Jay M. Savage. He performed postdoctoral work at the National Museum of Natural History and Louisiana State University, eventually taking a position as a professor of biology at Southeastern Louisiana University.

Slowinski was a founder of the first online herpetological journal, Contemporary Herpetology, and served as its editor-in-chief. He was also the curator for the Department of Herpetology for the California Academy of Sciences. His primary area of research was venomous snakes, having written some 40 peer-reviewed articles and one book.

Death and legacy
On September 11, 2001, while researching in an isolated region of Myanmar, Slowinski was bitten by a Suzhen's krait (Bungarus suzhenae). He died 29 hours later after his team, which included Mark W. Moffett, made several failed attempts to obtain medical attention. The September 11 terrorist attacks made communication with the embassy difficult, and by the time the embassy prepared a helicopter, the weather was particularly bad, thus preventing a helicopter from transporting Slowinski to a hospital, and making it impossible to carry medical supplies to the campsite.

A biography of Slowinski titled The Snake Charmer was written in 2008 by Jamie James.

Three species have been named after Slowinski: a species of North American corn snake (Pantherophis slowinskii), a species of bent-toed gecko native to Myanmar (Cyrtodactylus slowinskii), and a species of krait native to Vietnam (Bungarus slowinskii).

Bibliography
Introduction to Genetics, 1998 – National Textbook Company, Lincolnwood, Illinois.

References

External links
 California Academy of Sciences: Joseph Bruno Slowinski
Contemporary Herpetology: In Memory of Joseph B. Slowinski
Frogweb – People – Slowinski, J.B.
Detailed account of J.Slowinski's death via krait bite
 Striking Beauties: Venomous Snakes at California Wild. Accessed 27 July 2007.
 In Memory of Joseph Slowinski 1962–2001 at Dr. Mark W. Moffett's website. Accessed 27 July 2007.
 Bit (mirror of article by Dr. Mark W. Moffett from the April 2002 issue of Outside Magazine) at Jacq.org. Accessed 27 July 2007.

American herpetologists
1962 births
2001 deaths
Deaths due to snake bites
Accidental deaths in Myanmar
Scientists from New York City
20th-century American zoologists
University of Kansas alumni
University of Miami alumni
Southeastern Louisiana University faculty